Jahmarie Wishart Adams (born March 19, 1993), known professionally as Jazz Cartier, is a Canadian rapper, singer, and songwriter. He is best known for his mixtapes, Marauding in Paradise and Hotel Paranoia.

He has twice been a long listed nominee for the Polaris Music Prize, in 2015 for Marauding in Paradise, and 2016 for Hotel Paranoia, and won the Juno Award for Rap Recording of the Year at the Juno Awards of 2017 for Hotel Paranoia. He released his debut studio album Fleurever in July 2018.

Early life
Jahmarie Wishart Adams was born on March 19, 1993, in Toronto, Ontario. His stepfather worked as a diplomat for the U.S. State Department, which made him move around frequently in childhood with his family, living in various times in the United States, Barbados and Kuwait attending 13 boarding schools.  He credits the different types of music he was exposed to in these locations as all having had an influence on his own style as a hip-hop musician. Cartier spent majority of his high school career at Avon Old Farms, a prestigious all-male boarding school located in Connecticut, and graduated after transferring to another prep school, the Blue Ridge School located in St. George, Virginia. He then spent a postgraduate year at Bridgton Academy in North Bridgton, ME after completing high school.

He was accepted to an art program at Columbia College Chicago in 2012 but, reluctant to move to a new city where he knew no one, he returned to Toronto.

Musical career

In 2013 the Get Home Safe Crew was formed in Toronto with 88Glam members Drew Howard & Derek Wise. They met through the city's nightlife scene and eventually moving into together in the Kensington Market neighbourhood.

Cartier had worked on an early version of his debut mixtape, Marauding in Paradise, in 2011, but was not satisfied with the tape. After moving back to Toronto, he began working with record producer Lantz after originally meeting in 2009 at a studio when Cartier was 16 years old. They released the song "Set Fire" in 2014. Performing in Toronto-area music venues, he quickly attracted attention — his track "Switch" was regularly played at Toronto Raptors games by team DJ 4Korners, and at a Toronto Red Bull Sound Select show in March 2015 he was introduced by rapper Kardinal Offishall.

Cartier's debut mixtape, Marauding in Paradise, was released on April 15, 2015. The mixtape was supported by three singles: "Switch", "New Religion" and "Dead or Alive".

Cartier's second mixtape, Hotel Paranoia, was released in February 2016 and was supported by the singles: "Stick & Move" and "I Know". On February 23, Cartier was announced as one of the performers at the 2016 Osheaga Festival.

He was a shortlisted nominee for the 2016 SOCAN Songwriting Prize for his track "Dead or Alive".  In 2017 he won a Juno Award for his mixtape Hotel Paranoia.

Cartier later announced that his next project following Hotel Paranoia would be titled Fleurever on December 16, 2016. Cartier released the lead single from the album titled, "Tempted" on January 6, 2017. The song peaked at number 91 on the Canadian Hot 100 chart, which became his highest and only charting single to date. Cartier later released the singles "Right Now", "Godflower" and "Which One" as singles from the album in 2018. Fleurever was released on July 27, 2018, and debuted at number 70 on the Canadian Albums Chart.

Discography

Studio albums

Mixtapes

Singles

As lead artist

As featured artist

Guest appearances

Awards and nominations

Filmography

References

External links
 
 Official SoundCloud

1993 births
Black Canadian musicians
Canadian male rappers
Rappers from Toronto
Living people
Juno Award for Rap Recording of the Year winners
Avon Old Farms alumni
21st-century Canadian male musicians
21st-century Canadian rappers